Fangfangia spinicleithralis is a species of cyprinid fish endemic to Indonesia where it is found in the peat swamp forests of Kalimantan Tengah, Borneo. It is the only member of its genus. The genus name Fangfangia honors the Chinese-Swedish ichthyologist Fang Fang Kullander (1962-2010), who specialized in the study of cyprinid fishes.

References

Cyprinid fish of Asia
Fish of Indonesia

Fish described in 2012
Taxa named by Ralf Britz